Tahla may refer to:

Tahla, Morocco, a town in Taza Province, Morocco
Tahla (genus), a genus of moths in the family Gelechiidae